Global Islamic Finance Report (GIFR) is an annual publication, covering recent developments in the global Islamic financial services industry. Produced by Edbiz Consulting, a London-based Islamic advisory firm, it is the first global publication of its kind. Edited by Professor Humayon Dar, it is the oldest yearbook in Islamic banking and finance and is considered as the most authentic source of information in the field. GIFR is also recognised for its pioneering work on the Islamic Finance Country Index (IFCI), which ranks about 50 countries of the world in terms of their involvement and leadership role in the Islamic financial services industry.

Each annual edition of GIFR has a special theme. Following themes have so far been covered:

 GIFR 2010: Size and growth of the Islamic financial services industry
 GIFR 2011: Islamic financial regulation
 GIFR 2012: Islamic philanthropy and social responsibility
 GIFR 2013: Halal industry and Islamic finance
 GIFR 2014: Human resource development for Islamic banking and finance
 GIFR 2015: Leadership in Islamic Banking & Finance
 GIFR 2016: Islamic Financial Policy
 GIFR 2017: Leadership in Islamic Banking & Finance

GIFR is a publication that provides analyses provided by the top industry players, academicians and policy makers. Its different annual editions have been sponsored by major financial institutions like Dubai Islamic Bank, CIMB Islamic, Commerzbank, ITS, Hong Leong Islamic Bank, Abu Dhabi Commercial Bank, National Commercial Bank, and others.

GIFR 2014 was launched at the Global Donors Forum held at Washington D.C. on April 13–16, 2014.

GIFR 2016 was launched at Global Islamic Finance Forum at Kuala Lumpur by Datuk Muhammad Ibrahim, Governor of Bank Negara Malaysia.

References

External links
 

Islamic economics